Madley is a surname. Notable people with the surname include:

Andrew Madley (born 1983), English football referee
Bobby Madley (born 1985), English football referee

See also
Malley